Bruce Edward Beeby (21 October 1921 – 20 October 2013) was an Australian actor who worked primarily in British films and television. He was probably best known for portraying Stephen "Mitch" Mitchell in the 1950s BBC radio serials Journey into Space.

He was married to Madi Hedd. They acted together in Britain for six years before returning to Australia in 1957.

In the late-1950s, he appeared in several live plays for Australian television, including Ending It, Rope, In the Zone, Shadow of Doubt, Sixty Point Bold, Citizen of Westminster and Black Limelight. He also compered quiz shows.

Selected filmography

 Harvest Gold (1945) - Harry Johnson
 Women of Twilight (1952) - Minor Role (uncredited)
 The Intruder (1953) - 2nd Detective
 The Limping Man (1953) - Kendall Brown
 Impulse (1954) - Harry Winters
 Front Page Story (1954) - Counsel for the Defence
 Johnny on the Spot (1954) - Terry Dunn
 The Golden Link (1954) - Sgt. Baker
 Time Is My Enemy (1954) - Roommate (uncredited)
 Profile (1954) - (uncredited)
 Radio Cab Murder (1954) - Inspector Rawlings
 The Teckman Mystery (1954) - Wallace
 Malaga (1954) - Potts
 The Glass Cage (1955) - 'Doctor' Treating Sapolio (uncredited)
 A Kid for Two Farthings (1955) - Policeman (uncredited)
 The Man in the Road (1956) - Dr. Manning
 Child in the House (1956) - Policeman
 Stranger in Town (1957) - William Ryland
 The Man in the Road (1957) - Macauley's Solicitor
 Smiley Gets a Gun (1958) - Dr. Gaspen
 Escort for Hire (1960) - Det. Sgt. Moore
 Payroll (1961) - Worth
 Pit of Darkness (1961) - Peter Mayhew
 A Matter of WHO (1961) - Capt. Brook
 Fate Takes a Hand (1961) - Inspector Phillips
 Serena (1962) - Det. Sergeant Conway
 Lawrence of Arabia (1962) - Captain at Officer's Club (uncredited)
 It's All Happening (1963) - Announcer
 The Devil-Ship Pirates (1964) - Pedro, a pirate
 A Hard Day's Night (1964) - Man Talking to Casino Manager (uncredited)
 Hammerhead (1968) - British Secret Service Guard (uncredited)
 Midas Run (1969) - Gordon
 Wuthering Heights (1970)

References

External links

Profile of Bruce Beeby at the National Archives of Australia
Bruce Beeby's obituary

1921 births
2013 deaths
Australian male film actors
Australian male television actors
Male actors from Sydney
Australian expatriates in the United Kingdom